The 2010 Swiss Indoors was a men's tennis tournament played on indoor hard courts. It was the 41st edition of the event known that year as the Davidoff Swiss Indoors, and was part of the 500 Series of the 2010 ATP World Tour. It was held at the St. Jakobshalle in Basel, Switzerland, from 1 November through 7 November 2010. Roger Federer won the singles title.

Players

Seeds

 Seeds are based on the rankings of October 25, 2010

Other entrants
The following players received wildcards into the singles main draw:
  Stéphane Bohli
  Marco Chiudinelli
  Radek Štěpánek

The following players received entry from the qualifying draw:
  Daniel Brands
  Robin Haase
  Jan Hájek
  Jarkko Nieminen

The following players received entries as a Lucky losers into the singles main draw:
  Karol Beck
  Tobias Kamke
  Paul-Henri Mathieu

Finals

Singles

 Roger Federer defeated  Novak Djokovic, 6–4, 3–6, 6–1
It was Federer's 4th title of the year and 65th of his career. It was his 4th win at the event, also winning in 2006-2008.

Doubles

 Bob Bryan /  Mike Bryan defeated  Daniel Nestor /  Nenad Zimonjić, 6–3, 3–6, [10–3]

References

External links
Official website

2010 ATP World Tour

2010